Marquis Dendy (born November 17, 1992) is an American track and field athlete, primarily known for horizontal jumping events. He is the 2015 National Champion in the Long jump. He grew up in Middletown, Delaware.

Injury forced long-jumper Dendy out of Rio Olympics.

USA National Track and field Championships

Major Track and Field Championships

NCAA
Dendy just had completed his final season at the University of Florida, where he won the 2015 NCAA Division I Outdoor Track and Field Championships in both the long jump and the triple jump, defending his 2014 championships in the same events.  He accomplished the same double at the 2015 NCAA Division I Indoor Track and Field Championships, setting the meet record in the triple jump. His first NCAA Championship was the 2013 Indoor Championship in the long jump.

High school
Marquis Dendy competed for Middletown High School in Middletown, Delaware where he set the state records in long jump  and triple jump . After high school he competed for the US in the 2012 NACAC Under-23 Championships in Athletics, winning the gold medal in the long jump.  He had previously experienced international competition as a 17-year-old in the 2010 World Junior Championships in Athletics where he finished 8th in the triple jump.

Personal
He grew up in a sporting family: his father was a sprinter at high school while his mother Dionne was a collegiate sprinter. His aunt Terri Dendy was a sprint relay medalist at the 1993 World Championships in Athletics. He shared the Delaware Sportswriters and Broadcasters Association's award as Delaware's Outstanding Athlete of 2014.

References

External links

Marquis Dendy twitter profile
Marquis Dendy instagram profile

Marquis Dendy University of Florida profile
Marquis Dendy Diamond League profile
Marquis Dendy Athletics profile

Living people
1992 births
Track and field athletes from Delaware
American male long jumpers
American male triple jumpers
African-American male track and field athletes
Florida Gators men's track and field athletes
World Athletics Championships athletes for the United States
USA Outdoor Track and Field Championships winners
USA Indoor Track and Field Championships winners
World Athletics Indoor Championships winners
World Athletics Indoor Championships medalists
Athletes (track and field) at the 2016 Summer Olympics
Athletes (track and field) at the 2020 Summer Olympics
Olympic track and field athletes of the United States
21st-century African-American sportspeople